Green Lake is a small lake northeast of Bisby Lodge in Herkimer County, New York.

See also
 List of lakes in New York

References 

Lakes of New York (state)
Lakes of Herkimer County, New York